Electro Team (ET) is a hip hop/eurodance band from Croatia, active since 1987.

ET's July 1993 single "Tek je 12 sati" was named by journalists and music critics as Croatia's hit of the decade. E.T. saw their greatest popularity while performing with their former lead singer Vanna, who joined the band in 1991 and left for solo career in 1998.

History

Electro Team was formed in Zagreb in 1987 by Adonis Ćulibrk – Boytronic. The band was inspired by the legendary hip-hop / electro band Mantronix. At that time, on Boytronic's invitation, Darko Juranovic D'Knock (then known under the pseudonyms DáReal and Doc. DáReal), joined the band, and they started a demo recording period in which they created several songs. At the end of the 1980s, Sky Rocker joined the band, but at the beginning of the Homeland War he went to the United States. The band had their first public performance in 1989 on Z3 Television (an experimental programme on Croatian Radiotelevision) where they performed “Miami Ladies“ in their own artistic interpretation. At that time, Vanna (Ivana Ranilović, today Vrdoljak), their future singer, still wasn't a part of their group. To the present day the band has put out seven studio albums. The band collaborated with the producer Ilan Kabiljo who at the time had a duet with Ivana Ranilović which was called Ilan & Ivana. Ivana soon became a backup singer in ET and this combination of hip hop and a female vocal proved to be very successful. Sky Rocker returned to Croatia in 1992 and took part in the production of  ET's debut album Electro Team produced by Tomo in der Mühlen which was mostly hip hop and pop rap oriented with heavy use of male rap vocals while Vanna's was appeared just in some songs. ET was becoming more and more popular, which made them first Croatian music band that appeared on MTV.

In spring 1991 Ivana Ranilović left the duet Ilan & Ivana and finally joined ET under her artistic name Vanna. During the war they recorded a song "Molitva za mir" (A Prayer for Peace) which became a huge hit and one of the most popular patriotic songs. In July 1993, they released "Tek je 12 sati" (It's Only 12 O'clock), a tremendously successful hit which, a few years later, was proclaimed Croatian hit of the decade. The song also had a great video which at that time was known in public as the most expensive video in the country ever.

Second to None their second studio album, recorded in 1994 brought turn to eurodance with more famele vocals and became instant success. At that time Vanna comes to be considered the best Croatian dance singer and the album, which generated eight hit singles, was even more popular than the first one. The same year the band got the most important Croatian music award – Porin – for the best vocal performance and the best video. In 1995, they received a Porin for the best single of the year for the song "Da ti nisam bila dovoljna" (That I Wasn't Enough for You).

Their third studio album Anno Domini (1996) sold more than 60,000 copies, while a single from the album "Ja ti priznajem" (I Confess to You) became a huge success. By 1998, the band held many concerts and they even became internationally famous. They set high standards in the production of videos, for which they got two Porin Awards. The same year Vanna and Darko Juranović D`Knock (then known as DáReal) left the band wanting to focus on their solo career.

In 2000 a new album was released with a new singer Andrea Čubrić under the title Disco Neckt. In 2001, another singer, Lana Klingor, replaced Andrea, and in Spring 2002, they put out another album called Vision 5 which brought more commercial dance pop sound while male rap vocals were reduced to minimum. This album brought them back to the top of the singles charts and Lana became accepted by the audience, bringing back the old and attracting some new fans. It sold very well and was certified Gold. They put out a compilation of the best hit singles from 1993 to 2003 under the title Decade, which was certified Silver.

In 2005, the band got a new singer, Katarina Rautek, and released their sixth album Frankfurt Bombay Tokyo, and in 2007, their last album so far, called Vrhunski album (An Excellent Album) whose sound is different from their previous, well-known style, bringing more softer europop and dance pop with elements of pop folk in some songs and without male rap vocals. In June 2007 the band celebrated 20 years since they were formed and started as the first rap and dance band in Croatia.

Although ET is no longer active and have changed a few lead singers, they never repeated the success they had in the 90s with Vanna as their lead singer.

In April 2016, Katarina leaves E.T., and in her place Sara-Elena Menkovska came, with which they were first introduced to the CMC Festival 2016 with the song "Ako možeš, oprosti". After 4 months, cooperation with a new singer ends and since then, the band E.T. is on a break.

Discography

Studio albums

 Electro Team (1992)
 Second to None (1994)
 Anno Domini (1996)
 Disco Neckt (2000)
 Vision 5 (2002)
 Frankfurt Bombay Tokyo (2005)
 Vrhunski album (2007)
 Powercore  (2010)

Compilation albums 

 Ja ti priznajem (1995)
 Decade (2003)

See also 
Croatian popular music

References 

Croatian pop music groups
Eurodance groups
Musical groups established in 1987